Macro-Warpean (or Macro-Huarpean) is a provisional proposal by Kaufman (1994) that connected the extinct Huarpe language with the previously connected Muran and Matanawí (Mura–Matanawí). Morris Swadesh had included Huarpe in his Macro-Jibaro proposal.

Language contact
For the Mura-Matanawi languages, Jolkesky (2016) notes that there are lexical similarities with the Kwaza, Taruma, Katukina-Katawixi, Arawak, Jeoromitxi, Tupi, and Arawa language families due to contact.

Comparison
Comparison of basic vocabulary in Matanawí and Mura-Pirahã by Diego Valio Antunes Alves (2019: 86), with data of both languages cited from Curt Nimuendajú (1925):

{| class="wikitable sortable"
! Portuguese gloss (original) !! English gloss (translated) !! Matanawí !! Mura-Pirahã
|-
| língua || tongue || ihuzɨ || ipopaj
|-
| lábio || lip || ɲaruzɨohᴐ || apipaj
|-
| orelha || ear || atahuzɨ || apopaj
|-
| cabelo || hair || apa zi jaa || apapataj
|-
| coxa || thigh || aritʊzɨ, aritᴐzi || akuapaj
|-
| boca || mouth || ɲaru zɨ || kaopaj
|-
| dente || tooth || arɨzɨ || atopaj
|-
| nariz || nose || natuzi || itopaj
|-
| olho || eye || tuʃiji || kupaj
|-
| braço || arm || apiji || atoewe
|-
| mão || hand || ũsu zɨ || upaj
|-
| unha da mão || fingernail || ũsuzɨhᴐ || upapaj
|-
| perna || leg || aturazɨ || ipopaj
|-
| pé || foot || iʃijɨ || apaj
|-
| água || water || apɨ || pe
|-
| fogo || fire || ua || wai
|-
| chuva || rain || apɨ || pe
|-
| lua || moon || ka || kahaiai
|-
| terra || earth || wɨsa || bege
|-
| pedra || stone || aja || aapuuj
|-
| sol || sun || viː || wese
|-
| casa || house || pi || ataj
|-
| rede || net || api || apiʃara
|-
| flecha || arrow || awɨ || apoahaj
|-
| pente || comb || parata || isowe
|-
| esteira || mat || kɨnũ || pahoese
|-
| panela || pan || wata || waaj
|-
| paus para produzir fogo || sticks for starting fire || ɨ || ie
|-
| mel || honey || ʦɨza || ahaj
|-
| milho || maize || iwari || tihuahaj
|-
| mandioca || manioc || mĩ || iʃehe
|-
| tabaco || tobacco || ɨsəki || iʧehe
|}

References

Indigenous languages of South America
Proposed language families